Had Kourt is a town in Sidi Kacem Province, Rabat-Salé-Kénitra, Morocco. According to the 2004 census it has a population of 5,051.

References

Populated places in Sidi Kacem Province
Municipalities of Morocco